Jayson Keeling (1966-2022) was an artist who worked in photography, video, sculpture, and installation. Keeling's work challenges conventional norms surrounding sex, gender, race, and religion. Keeling often reconfigured popular iconography, to explore notions of masculinity, and cultural ritual.

Early life and education 
Jayson Keeling was born in 1966 in Brooklyn, NY to Jamaican parents. Keeling's grew up between Jamaica and the Bronx, New York. His bi-cultural upbringing would later influence his work. Keeling graduated from the Fashion Institute of Technology in 1986 with an AA in Fashion Illustration and Art History. Keeling started off by working as a photographer and film director in fashion, music, film, and the pornography industry.

Art 
Jayson Keeling mines popular culture, and mythology to create artworks that question and deconstruct accepted politics of sex, gender, race, and religion. Keeling works in photography, video, sculpture, and installation.

His work often pulls from different visual cultures and then "jams them all into the same frame." Keeling often works in the realms in-between cultures, creating work that is "neither here nor there." He often uses performative gestures to explore ritual and masculinity.

Jayson Keeling's photographs have been described as violent, sexy, glam and grotesque.

A work by Keeling, a diptych of photographs of legendary dancer and choreographer, Willi Ninja, exhibited at the 2008 "The B Sides" show at Aljira, a Center for Contemporary Art was described by art critic Benjamin Genocchio as "one of the show's most arresting exhibits" in The New York Times.

Selected exhibitions 

2014

 Aljira at 30: Dream and Reality, New Jersey State Museum
 The First Sweet Music at John and June Allcott Gallery
 TEN at Cindy Rucker Gallery

2013

 Stars in My Pocket Like Grains of Sand Curated by Jayson Keeling at the Lower East Side Printshop.
 Another New York at Barclays Center
 Psychosexual at Andrew Rafacz Gallery

2012

 Bigger Than Shadows at DODGE Gallery
 tête-à-tête at Yancey Richardson Gallery
 tête-à-tête at Rhona Hoffman Gallery

2011

 Nov 2011 - Four Minutes, Thirty-Three Seconds at LegalArt
 See Jungle! See Jungle! Go Join Your Gang, Yeah. City All Over! Go Ape Crazy. at Third Streaming
 Seoul Food: apexart Outbound Residents Talk Shop at Apexart

2010

 Automatic For The People: John Ahearn and Rigoberto Torres at Aljira, a Center for Contemporary Art
 Bite:Street-inspired Art & Fashion at 3rd Streaming Gallery - 10 Green Street, 2nd FL
 Chapter Four: Let It Die at Lehmann Maupin - Chrystie Street
 Lush Life, Chapter Eight: 17 Plus 25 Is 32 at Scaramouche
 Lush Life at Collette Blanchard Gallery
 LUSH LIFE: WHISTLE at Sue Scott Gallery
 Jamaica Flux: Workspaces & Windows 2010 Art as Action at Jamaica Center for Arts and Learning
 CONVERSIONs | one-night stands at BronxArtSpace

2009

 Rockstone & Bootheel: Contemporary West Indian Art at Real Art Ways
 99 44/100% Pure at Real Art Ways
 Everyman's an Angel at NY Studio Gallery
 PULSE at Taller Boricua Galleries at the Julia de Burgos Cultural Center
 resident/alien at Apexart
 Queens International 4 at Queens Museum of Art
 Perception As Object at Monya Rowe Gallery

2008

 VIDEOSTUDIO at Studio Museum in Harlem
 "Red badge of courage revisited" at Newark Arts Council,
 Strangers at Privateer
 “Homecoming” at ABC NO RIO
 Summer Mixed Tape Volume 1: the Get Smart Edition at Exit Art
 Intransit at Moti Hasson
 DEADLIEST CATCH: Hamptons at CORE : Hamptons

2007

 Sex in the City at The DUMBO Arts Center (DAC)
 The Wu-Tang / googolplex Show (Congress) at GBE@passerby
 Six Degrees of Separation at Paul Sharpe Contemporary Art
 AIM27 “Here and Elsewhere” at Bronx Museum of the Arts

References

1966 births
Living people
American photographers